FC Barcelona Ice Hockey is an ice hockey club in Barcelona, Catalonia, that is part of FC Barcelona club. They currently play in the Spanish League and their home arena is the Palau de Gel.

History 

The team was founded in 1972, after the construction of the Pista de Gel. The first title was the Cup in 1976. In the mid-eighties decade, the senior team was disbanded leaving only the junior team. In 1990 the club came back to top competition, and after that won League and Cup competitions in the 1996-97 season.

Titles 

 7 Liga Nacional de Hockey Hielo Spanish Champion: 1986-87, 1987–88, 1996–97, 2001–02, 2008–09, 2020–21, 2021–22
 6 Copa del Rey de Hockey Hielo: 1975-76, 1976–77, 1981–82, 1996–97, 2014–15, 2018–19

References

External links
  Official website

Barcelona
Ice hockey
1972 establishments in Spain